Christophe Brunet (born 28 March 1967) is a French judoka.

Achievements

See also
European Judo Championships
History of martial arts
Judo in France
List of judo techniques
List of judoka
Martial arts timeline

References

External links

1967 births
Living people
French male judoka
Place of birth missing (living people)